Ana Bogdan was the defending champion but chose not to participate.

Océane Dodin won the title, defeating Audrey Albié in the final, 3–6, 6–2, 7–5.

Seeds

Draw

Finals

Top half

Bottom half

References

Main Draw

2023 ITF Women's World Tennis Tour